Aeromonas finlandensis is a bacterium from the genus Aeromonas which has been isolated from the Lake Pyhälampi in Finland.

References

 

Aeromonadales
Bacteria described in 2015